Funk Your Head Up is the second studio album by American hip hop group Ultramagnetic MCs. It was released on March 17, 1992, via Mercury Records/PolyGram.

Many of the tracks were remixed by outside producers at Mercury Records' insistence. The result was an album that disappointed hardcore fans of the group, while doing little to improve their sales. The sole hit single was a Beatminerz remix of "Poppa Large" that was not included on the album.

Critical reception
Trouser Press wrote: "If hip-hop were only about clever lyrics and concrete breakbeats, the UMC’s might have been on top of the world. But next to the street socio-politics of Ice Cube, the gangsta dramatics of Dr. Dre and the shock gimmickry of Geto Boys, Ultramagnetics were beginning to sound nostalgic."

In a retrospective review, The Quietus called the album "flawed but frequently magnificent," writing that the production "redefines the concept of funk for the hip hop era and gives Keith's rhymes, in particular, the sort of blaxploitation-via-sci-fi setting they uniquely demanded."

Track listing

Personnel 
 Keith Matthew Thornton - main artist, producer
 Maurice Russell Smith - main artist, producer
 Cedric Ulmont Miller - main artist, producer
 Trevor Randolph - main artist, producer
 Timothy Blair - featured artist (tracks: 21, 23)
 Henrik Milling - featured artist & producer (track 9)
 Charles Lewis - producer (track 17)
 Henrik Leif Marquart - co-producer (tracks: 3, 16, 19)
 William "Spaceman" Patterson - guitar (tracks: 10, 15, 16, 21)
 Alli Truch - art direction & design
 Michael Bays - art direction
 Michael Lavine - photography

References

External links

1992 albums
Mercury Records albums
Ultramagnetic MCs albums